Kulmasa is a town in the Sawla-Tuna-Kalba District, Savannah Region, Ghana. In the 1890s, it marked the southern frontier of the Kingdom of Wala.

References

Populated places in the Savannah Region (Ghana)